Two shootings in Nigeria occurred on Christmas Day church services in northern Nigeria on 25 December 2012, at churches in Maiduguri and Potiskum. At least twelve casualties were reported. Terror organisation Boko Haram claimed not to be responsible, however is suspected to be.

In the city of Potiskum, Yobe, in the north east of the country armed men shot at least 6 church-goers. Afterwards the church was set in fire. In Maiduguri as well 6 church-goers were killed, including the priest of the church.

Three days later, on 28 December, in the village of Musari another fifteen Christians were killed. Attackers invaded the village and cut their throats while asleep. The victims included a traffic police officer and fourteen civilians.

See also
December 2011 Northern Nigeria attacks
April 2012 Kaduna bombings

References

2012 murders in Nigeria
Terrorist incidents in Yobe State
Terrorist incidents in Maiduguri
Mass murder in 2012
Spree shootings in Nigeria
Arson in Africa
Islamist attacks on churches
Terrorist incidents in Nigeria in 2012
Massacres perpetrated by Boko Haram
December 2012 events in Nigeria
Attacks on religious buildings and structures in Nigeria